Poloni is a municipality in the state of São Paulo in Brazil. The population is 6,113 (2020 est.) in an area of 135 km2. The elevation is 548 m.

Poloni is nearly surrounded by the municipality of Monte Aprazível, but it shares a border of only 160 metres with Macaubal.

References

Municipalities in São Paulo (state)